Belle Linsky (1904–1987) was a businesswoman and philanthropist who was a Swingline Inc. executive with her husband, Swingline's president  Jack Linsky. In 1982, she donated much of her art collection, valued at $90 million, to the Metropolitan Museum of Art.

Life
Belle Linsky was born in Kiev in 1904 and came to the United States as a child. With her husband she owned 19 percent of the stock of the Swingline corporation, based in New York City at the time, which they sold to American Brands Inc. in 1970 for $210 million. She was treasurer of Swingline at the time of the sale and Jack Linsky was inventor, president, and chairman.

She lived in  Palm Beach, Florida and New York, where much of her art collection was housed. She died in New York on Monday, September 28, 1987.

Philanthropy and art collection 
In 1965, the Linskys endowed for $1 million a pavilion that bears their names at the Beth Israel Medical Center in Manhattan.

She and her husband, Jack Linsky, started collecting art during The Great Depression. After Mr. Linsky died in 1980, much of the art collection went into The Jack and Belle Linsky Foundation. In 1982, Mrs. Linsky decided to give some to The Metropolitan Museum of Art in New York, as well as a dozen other American museums. The collection includes more than 1000 objects. The bulk of which is housed in the 3,980 square-foot Jack and Belle Linsky Galleries at the museum.

At one point the Linskys had one of the largest Fabergé egg collections in America.

References

1904 births
1987 deaths
People from New York City
American art collectors
Women art collectors
American women philanthropists
People associated with the Metropolitan Museum of Art
Philanthropists from New York (state)
Emigrants from the Russian Empire to the United States